Red Rocking Chair is an album by Doc and Merle Watson, released in 1981 on the Flying Fish label.

Reception

Writing for Allmusic, music critic Steve Leggett wrote of the album "Watson brings his own considerable guitar and banjo skills to bear on this selection of folk and blues tunes. Doc's voice is as easy and as comfortable as an old fishing hat ... further proof of how Watson makes everything he touches fit into his personal and seamless tour of American folk music."

Track listing
 "Sadie" (T. Michael Coleman, Byron Hill) – 2:23
 "Fisher's Hornpipe/Devil's Dream" (Traditional) – 1:38
 "Along the Road" (Dan Fogelberg) – 2:42
 "Smoke, Smoke, Smoke" (Merle Travis, Tex Williams) – 2:39
 "Below Freezing" (Coleman) – 2:12
 "California Blues" (Jimmie Rodgers) – 3:13
 "John Hurt" (Tom Paxton, Doc Watson) – 2:22
 "Mole in the Ground" (Traditional) – 2:22
 "Any Old Time" (Jimmie Rodgers) – 2:21
 "Red Rocking Chair" (Traditional, Watson) – 1:57
 "How Long Blues" (Leroy Carr) – 2:42
 "Down Yonder" (Traditional) – 2:15

Personnel
Doc Watson – vocals, guitar, harmonica, banjo
Merle Watson – guitar, banjo
T. Michael Coleman – bass, harmony vocals
Herb Pedersen – harmony vocals
Ron Tutt – drums
Gene Estes – percussion
Hank "Bones" Kahn – bones
Al Perkins – pedal steel guitar
Charlie Musselwhite – harmonica
Byron Berline – fiddle
Tom Scott – clarinet
Production notes
Mitch Greenhill – producer
Hank Cicalo – engineer
Milt Calise – assistant engineer
Jon Hartley Fox – liner notes

References

External links
 Doc Watson discography

1981 albums
Doc Watson albums
Flying Fish Records albums